Galium spurium, the stickwilly or false cleavers, is a plant species of the Rubiaceae. It is widespread across Europe, Asia, Africa and Canada, and is naturalized in Australia. It is considered a noxious weed in many places.

Galium spurium is an erect or reclining herb up to 50 cm tall. Stems are square in cross-section. Leaves are in whorls of 6–8, narrowly lanceolate. Flowers are in multi-flowered cymes or panicles, white or yellow-green.

Subspecies
Many varietal and subspecific names have been proposed, but at present (May 2014) only 3 are recognized:

Galium spurium subsp. africanum Verdc. - mountains of tropical and southern Africa; also Saudi Arabia, Yemen, Socotra
Galium spurium subsp. ibicinum (Boiss. & Hausskn.) Ehrend. - Turkey, Iran, Iraq, Afghanistan, Pakistan, Turkmenistan, Tajikistan
Galium spurium subsp. spurium - widespread

References

External links

 Impact and control in Australia
line drawing for Flora of Pakistan
Plants for a Future
NatureGate, Luonotoportti (Helsinki), false cleavers
Tela Botanica, Gaillet bâtard
Floraweb, Galium spurium L., Kleinfrüchtiges Kletten-Labkraut

Flora of Africa
Flora of Asia
Flora of Australia
Flora of Canada
Flora of China
Flora of Europe
Flora of Korea
Flora of Siberia
spurium
Plants described in 1753
Taxa named by Carl Linnaeus